The Riverside Transit Agency (RTA) is the main transit agency for western Riverside County, California, United States. RTA provides both local and regional services throughout the region with 39 fixed-routes (including RapidLink Gold Line), 9 CommuterLink routes, and Dial-A-Ride services using a fleet of 339 vehicles. In the cities of Corona, Beaumont and Banning, RTA coordinates regional services with municipal transit systems. In Riverside, RTA coordinates with the city's Riverside Special Services, which provides ADA complementary service to RTA's fixed-route services.

RTA was established as a joint powers agency on August 15, 1975, and began operating bus service on March 16, 1977.

Governance
RTA is governed by a board of directors composed of 22 elected officials from 18 cities in western Riverside County and four members of the County Board of Supervisors.

The member jurisdictions include the cities of Banning, Beaumont, Canyon Lake, Corona, Eastvale, Hemet, Jurupa Valley, Lake Elsinore, Moreno Valley, Menifee, Murrieta, Norco, Perris, Riverside, San Jacinto, Temecula, Wildomar and the unincorporated areas of Riverside County Supervisorial Districts I, II, III and V.

Services
RTA's service consists of 39 local fixed routes and 9 CommuterLink Express routes. The fixed-route service includes tourist trolleys (stylized rubber-tired buses, not to be confused with actual trolleys) as well as the RapidLink Gold Line. The agency also provides dial-a-ride service in compliance with the Americans with Disabilities Act.

In 2003, RTA launched CommuterLink, its first bus service designed to serve Riverside County's growing number of commuters. The specially designed express buses have limited stop service to major transit centers and Metrolink stations in Riverside county. In 2005, RTA debuted free Wi-Fi Internet service aboard its Temecula-Riverside CommuterLink Route 202, making the agency among the first in Southern California to offer such amenities aboard public buses. By the end of 2016, Wi-fi was offered on all of the agency's fixed-route buses.

On Monday, August 28, 2017, RTA launched the RapidLink Gold Line. The limited stop route runs between Corona and UC Riverside along Magnolia and University avenues. Operating Monday - Friday from 6:30 - 8:30 a.m. and 1:30 - 5:30 p.m, buses depart every 15 minutes. The Gold Line provides service that's up to 30 percent faster than other buses along the same corridor. Newly branded RapidLink Gillig BRT Plus buses along the route carry up to 38 seated customers and 17 standees and continue RTA's tradition of clean-burning fuel, and include features like free Wi-Fi and USB charging ports.

Fares 
As of 1-01-2023 (youths pay a quarter a ride thru June 2023):

 Through June 2023.

College passes
In September 2006, RTA partnered with the University of California, Riverside (UCR) to provide their students with an all-access bus pass. UC Riverside students get free rides on all fixed-route and CommuterLink buses by swiping their valid university identification cards through any RTA bus farebox when they board. The program, called U-Pass, is designed to help ease traffic congestion around campus, reduce parking problems and encourage ride-sharing. Additionally, RTA operates a trolley service called the Crest Cruiser that is free to UCR students and travels around the university to off-campus housing and retail outlets. Students of La Sierra University have also benefited from U-Pass since January 2009, and California Baptist University joined the program in August 2009.

As of August 21, 2008, RTA has also partnered with  Riverside Community College District (RCCD) to provide the same free transit services to students at the Riverside City and Moreno Valley college campuses. (The Norco campus failed to pass an initiative to fund the program, and currently only students at Riverside and Moreno Valley are eligible.) The program, called Go Pass, requires that students swipe their valid RCCD ID cards through the bus farebox when boarding. As of August 2014, the Go-Pass has logged more than 4.5 million RCCD student rides.

In August 2010, RTA expanded the reach of its Go-Pass program by partnering with the Mt. San Jacinto College District. Students at the Banning, Menifee and San Jacinto campuses who pay their student fees are allowed unlimited rides on all fixed-route and CommuterLink buses with the swipe of their ID card.

Fare subsidies
City of Riverside employees ride free under the CityPass program, which was initiated in the summer of 2007.

Under an agreement with the Riverside County Courts, anyone serving as a juror at the Riverside, Banning and Murrieta Courthouses is entitled to free travel on any RTA bus.

The City of Riverside, using funding from the South Coast Air Quality Management District, began offering discounted bus passes to all residents of the city in December 2009. This program, called Riverside Go Transit, provides a 30% discount on monthly passes.

Any person who meets RTA active duty military, police or fire personnel requirements rides free on RTA fixed-route buses. Active duty military personnel must wear the appropriate uniform at the time of boarding or present to the driver a valid U.S. Uniformed Services ID card indicating active service or a Common Access card indicating uniformed services or active duty. Police and fire personnel must be in full uniform at the time of boarding. Customers must wear the appropriate uniform or show appropriate ID each time they board a bus to receive the discounted fare.

Transit centers
RTA maintains several transit centers throughout their service area. Riverside is served by the Riverside - Downtown Metrolink station which also serves as a major transfer hub.

The Downtown Perris station, located between 1st and 2nd Streets east of C Street in Perris, opened on January 10, 2010, with 6 bus bays and a park-and-ride lot. The center is also a station for weekend excursion trains from the Orange Empire Railway Museum, and is a station on Metrolink's Perris Valley Line.

The Corona Transit Center opened in September 2010, adjacent to the North Main Corona Metrolink station. The center has 8 bus bays, additional park-and-ride parking and a direct connection to the Metrolink station and its associated parking garage via a pedestrian bridge.

Major transfer points are also located at several shopping centers throughout the area such as The Galleria at Tyler, the Moreno Valley Mall, the Hemet Valley Mall, the Outlets at Lake Elsinore, and Temecula's Promenade Mall.

Fleet
RTA's 40-foot and CommuterLink buses are powered entirely by compressed natural gas, with the agency's conversion to the fuel completed in 2001. They also operate CNG fueling stations at their Riverside and Hemet maintenance facilities that help fuel not only transit vehicles, but the alternative-fuel fleet of various government agencies.

In 2013, RTA began the process of replacing their old NABI 40 LFW fleet with newer 42-foot, Gillig Low Floor BRT Suburban buses. The traditional red, white and blue colors of RTA were updated to feature solid blue on the top portion of the bus, with a ribbon of blue and red around the bus's sides and rear. The modern buses also have a more spacious interior, padded and contoured seats, colored headsigns, USB charging ports for customers' mobile phones and tablets, and a design that allows for quicker wheelchair fastening and overall faster customer boarding.

Financials
RTA is largely funded by passenger fares, Local Transportation Funds (LTF), Federal Transit Administration (FTA), State Transit Assistance (STA), Riverside County Measure A, and Transportation Uniform Mitigation Fees (TUMF).

Transportation NOW
In 1992, RTA's board of directors created 'Transportation NOW' to promote the discussion of public transportation alternatives. Since then, the program has grown to include six chapters: Greater Riverside, Hemet San Jacinto area, Moreno Valley/Perris, Northwest, San Gorgonio Pass area, and Southwest. Each chapter meets monthly to discuss current issues surrounding public transit and ways to promote its usage and lobby for improvements.

References

External links

Bus transportation in California
Transit authorities with natural gas buses
Transportation in Riverside, California
Public transportation in Riverside County, California
Transit agencies in California
Murrieta, California